Inielika is a volcano located in the central part of the island of Flores, Indonesia, north of the city of Bajawa.

References 
 

Inelika
Inelika
Inelika
Complex volcanoes